Cory Johnson (born 1966) is an American journalist.

Cory Johnson may also refer to:

Cory Johnson (basketball) (born 1988), American professional basketball player
Cory Johnson (gridiron football) (born 1992), American gridiron football defensive lineman

See also
Corey Johnson (disambiguation)